Ashes of the Wake is the fourth studio album and first major-label release by American heavy metal band Lamb of God, released in 2004 via Epic Records. The album debuted at number 27 on the Billboard 200, selling 35,000 copies in its first week and was rated by Guitar World as the 49th greatest Guitar Album of all Time. This album also was rated by Metal Hammer as the 5th greatest Metal Album of The 21st Century. The album was inspired by the events that took place during the war in Iraq with songs such as "Ashes of the Wake" (which includes snippets of former Marine Staff Sergeant Jimmy Massey in an interview after his return from the Iraq War), "Now You've Got Something to Die For", "One Gun" and "The Faded Line". The quote at the beginning of "Omerta" is a paraphrase of the Sicilian Mafia's code of silence. As of August 2010, Ashes of the Wake has sold 398,000 copies in the United States. Ten years after its release, as of 2014, sales have topped 400,000 copies sold and is Lamb of God’s best-selling record. The album was certified gold by the Recording Industry Association of America in February 2016.

Releases
The first pressing came with a bonus disc titled "Pure American Metal", including songs taken from the band's previous albums (Burn the Priest, New American Gospel and As the Palaces Burn), a live recording of the song "Black Label" from DVD Terror and Hubris, as well as a pre-production demo of the song "Laid to Rest".

The Japanese edition included a bonus song "Another Nail for Your Coffin" which was released worldwide in 2010 in a three-CD box set called Hourglass: The Anthology. The song was later included on the 15th anniversary edition of the album.

A DualDisc version was released in the United States. The DVD side contained the album in LPCM 2.0, and Dolby Digital 5.1 surround sound, as well as various video clips, including the promo videos for "Now You've Got Something to Die For" (intended to promote the Killadelphia release) and "Laid to Rest", a short on the New England Metalfest, a "Meet the Band" and a clip from the Terror and Hubris DVD. A production error in the 5.1 mix of "Break You" causes the vocals to pitch shift high and low throughout the song.

Reception
The album was generally well received; Blabbermouth.net gave it a 7 rating. Johnny Loftus of AllMusic gave it a 4 out of 5 star rating. He praised Blythe's vocals, saying they became, "Lamb of God's threshold of pain conduit."

Track listing

Personnel

Lamb of God
Randy Blythe – vocals
Mark Morton – lead guitar
Willie Adler – rhythm guitar
John Campbell – bass
Chris Adler – drums

Additional musicians
Alex Skolnick (of Testament) – second guitar solo on song "Ashes of the Wake"
Chris Poland (formerly of Megadeth) – third guitar solo on song "Ashes of the Wake"

Artwork
Ken Adams – art direction, design
Greg Watermann – photography

Production
Machine – producer, engineer, recording, mixing
Lamb of God – production
John Agnello – engineer
Tony Schloff, Todd Parker, Dan Korneff – Pro Tools 
Ted Young, Al Weatherhead, Casey Martin, Jeremy Miller, and Cam DiNunzio – assisted Pro Tools 
Mark Wilder – mastering
 
Management
Paul Conroy – management for Entertainment Services Unlimited
Scott Greer – product manager
Kaz Utsunomiya – A&R
Tim Borror – booking agent for Face the Music Touring
Jeffery R. Cohen – legal for Millen, White Zelano & Branigan

Charts

Certifications

See also
 List of anti-war songs

References

2004 albums
Lamb of God (band) albums
Epic Records albums
Prosthetic Records albums
Political music albums by American artists
Albums produced by Machine (producer)